Edwin Arthur Peel (1 March 1911 – 10 June 1992) was a British educational psychologist.  He was Professor of Education, University of Birmingham, 1950–1978.

References 

 Jason Tomes, ‘Peel,  Edwin Arthur  (1911–1992)’, Oxford Dictionary of National Biography, Oxford University Press,  2004 accessed
 ‘PEEL, Prof. Edwin Arthur’,   Who Was Who,  A & C Black,   1920–2008;     online edn,   Oxford University Press, Dec 2007       accessed 29 Jan 2012
 http://hopc.bps.org.uk/document-download-area/document-download$.cfm?file_uuid=8437CF7A-C1A8-4AAD-1476-F961E49D9883&ext=pdf

1911 births
1992 deaths
British psychologists
Presidents of the British Psychological Society
20th-century psychologists